Amerika Deutsche Post was an American Nazi propaganda newspaper published in New York prior to US entry into World War II.

References

Nazi propaganda organizations
Defunct newspapers published in New York City